Buddy Goode is an ARIA award-winning musical comedy character created by Australian performer and songwriter Michael Carr. Carr portrays Goode by speaking and singing in an American-style accent. The character first appeared in 2007 with the successful single Dutchy In The Morning, and subsequent debut album It's All Goode in 2008 released through ABC Music.

Since 2015, Carr has released five studio albums, and one best of album as Goode, as well as touring extensively throughout Australia.

Carr has been nominated five times for the Best Comedy Release ARIA Award as Goode, winning the prestigious award twice (in 2012 and 2014). He also won the Mo Award for comedy act of the year in 2014, amongst numerous other accolades. Carr is the son of late musician and composer Warren Carr, who was best known for his 20-year stint as a pianist on television's  Play School.

More Rubbish, Carr's sixth studio album as Goode, was released on December 16, 2016, and launched at the Rooty Hill RSL the following day.

Discography

Awards and nominations

ARIA Music Awards
The ARIA Music Awards are a set of annual ceremonies presented by Australian Recording Industry Association (ARIA), which recognise excellence, innovation, and achievement across all genres of the music of Australia. They commenced in 1987. 

! 
|-
| 2011
| The One And Only Buddy Goode
| Best Comedy Release
|
| rowspan="5"|
|-
| 2012
| Unappropriate
| Best Comedy Release
|
|-
| 2014
| It's A Buddy Goode Christmas
| Best Comedy Release
|
|-
| 2015
| Songs to Ruin Every Occasion
| Best Comedy Release
|
|-
| 2017
| More Rubbish
| Best Comedy Release
|
|-
|}

References

External links
Official Website
ABC Music Artist Profile

Australian comedy musicians
Australian male comedians
ARIA Award winners